Secular Organizations for Sobriety (SOS), also known as Save Our Selves, is a non-profit network of autonomous addiction recovery groups. The program stresses the need to place the highest priority on sobriety and uses mutual support to assist members in achieving this goal. The Suggested Guidelines for Sobriety emphasize rational decision-making and are not religious or spiritual in nature. SOS represents an alternative to the spiritually based addiction recovery programs such as Alcoholics Anonymous (AA). SOS members may also attend AA meetings, but SOS does not view spirituality or surrendering to a Higher Power as being necessary to maintain abstinence.

History
James Christopher's alcoholism began when he was a teenager. He had originally sought help in Alcoholics Anonymous (AA), but was uncomfortable with the emphasis on God and spirituality and he began looking for direction in the writings of secular humanists. Christopher wrote about his frustrations with AA and his own developing program for recovery. In 1985, Free Inquiry published an article "Sobriety Without Superstition" written by Christopher. He received hundreds of letters in response and decided to organize secular, self-help, alcoholism recovery group meetings. The first such meeting was held in November 1986 in North Hollywood, California, and meetings continue to this day at the Center for Inquiry in Los Angeles and at other locations. Christopher has been continuously sober since 1978.

Processes 
SOS recognizes genetic and environmental factors contributing to addiction, but allows each member to decide whether or not alcoholism is a disease. SOS holds the view that alcoholics can recover (addictive behaviors can be arrested), but that ultimately it is never cured; relapse is always possible. SOS does not endorse sponsor/sponsee relationships.

The SOS program is based on the Suggested Guidelines for Sobriety, that emphasize the "sobriety priority." In order to change, members must make abstinence their top priority: not drinking despite changing conditions in their lives. SOS suggests members follow a daily, three part, Cycle of Sobriety: acknowledgment of their addiction, acceptance of their addictions and prioritization of maintaining sobriety. Members are also encouraged to develop strategies or aphorisms that strengthen their resolve to maintain sobriety. on what SOS teaches

Suggested Guidelines for Sobriety
These guidelines are suggested by SOS for maintaining sobriety.
To break the cycle of denial and achieve sobriety, we first acknowledge that we are alcoholics or addicts.
We reaffirm this daily and accept without reservation the fact that as clean and sober individuals, we can not and do not drink or use, no matter what.
Since drinking or using is not an option for us, we take whatever steps are necessary to continue our Sobriety Priority lifelong.
A quality of life, "the good life," can be achieved. However, life is also filled with uncertainties. Therefore, we do not drink or use regardless of feelings, circumstances, or conflicts.
We share in confidence with each other our thoughts and feelings as sober, clean individuals.
Sobriety is our Priority, and we are each responsible for our lives and sobriety.

Meetings
While each SOS meeting is autonomous, SOS does provide a meeting format. The opening reading for meeting conveners summarizes their program. Following the reading of the opening, typically there are announcements, acknowledgment of members sobriety anniversaries and a reading of the Suggested Guidelines. The suggested opening reads as follows.

Demographics
A preliminary survey of SOS members was conducted in 1996. The survey results showed SOS attracted members with secular attitudes; 70% had no current religious affiliation and 70% were self-described atheists or agnostics, while another 22% described themselves as spiritual but non-churchgoers. SOS members were predominantly white (99%) employed (nearly half were employed full-time) males (1/4 of the respondents were female) over the age of 40. Abstinence was the reported goal of 86% of SOS members; 70% of respondents reported that they were currently abstinent (for an average of 6.3 years), another 16% were "mostly abstinent."  The majority of SOS members planned long-term affiliation with SOS. Nearly every member surveyed had been exposed to AA, the average rate of AA attendance amongst SOS members in the previous month was 4.5 meetings. A 2007 survey of addiction recovery groups found that religiosity correlated negatively with participation in SOS.

See also 

Addiction recovery groups
Alcoholism
Cognitive behavioral therapy
Drug addiction
LifeRing Secular Recovery
Rational Recovery
SMART Recovery
Women for Sobriety
Moderation Management (MM)
 Pagans in Recovery (PIR)
 Association of Recovering Motorcyclists (ARM)
 Celebrate Recovery (CR)

References

Literature

Further reading 

White, William L (2003) Management of the High-Risk DUI Offender, Institute for Legal, Administrative and Policy Studies, University of Illinois at Springfield

External links
 SOS International
 SOS Resources on The Center for Inquiry site
 

Addiction organizations in the United States
Mental health organizations in California
Organizations established in 1986
1986 establishments in California
Support groups